Sylvie Brunel (born 13 July 1960 in Douai) is a French economist and geographer, best known for her work for Action Against Hunger from 1989 to 2002, and her various publications in Que sais-je?. She was awarded the Legion of Honour in 2002.

Books

Essays 
 La vache du riche mange le grain… du riche, LSF, 1985.
 Asie, Afrique : grenier vides, greniers pleins, Economica, « Économie agricole », 1986.
 Le Nordeste brésilien, les véritables enjeux, LSF, 1986.
 Tiers Mondes. Controverses et réalités, Economica, 1987.
 Une Tragédie banalisée, la faim dans le monde, Hachette-Pluriel, 1991,  Prix Pierre Chauleur from the Académie des sciences d'outre-mer
 Les Tiers Mondes, La Documentation photographique, 7014, La Documentation française, 1992.
 Le Gaspillage de l'aide publique, Seuil, 1993.
 Le Sud dans la nouvelle économie mondiale, PUF, 1995.
 Le Sous-développement, PUF, « Que sais-je ? », 1996.
 Ceux qui vont mourir de faim, Seuil, 1997.
 La Coopération Nord-Sud, PUF, « Que sais-je ? », 1997
 La Faim dans le monde. Comprendre pour agir, PUF, 1999. Obtention du prix Conrad Malte-Brun de la Société de Géographie en 2001
 Action contre la faim, sous la coord. de Sylvie Brunel : Géopolitique de la faim (2001) .
 Famines et politique, Presses de Sciences Po, 2002 .
 Frontières (roman), Denoël, 2003 .
 Le Développement durable, PUF, « Que sais-je ? », 2004 ; nouvelle édition 2009.
 L'Afrique. Un continent en réserve de développement, Éditions Bréal, 2004 
 prix Robert-Cornevin 2004 de l’Académie des sciences d’outre-mer.
 L'Afrique dans la mondialisation, La documentation photographique, 8048, La Documentation française, 2005.
 La Déliaison (roman), coécrit avec sa fille Ariane Fornia, Denoël, 2005.
 La Planète disneylandisée. Chroniques d'un tour du monde, Éditions Sciences humaines, 2006 ; nouvelle édition enrichie en 2012.
 À qui profite le développement durable, Larousse, 2008. Prix Luc Durand-Reville de l'Académie des sciences morales et politiques
 Nourrir le monde. Vaincre la faim, Larousse, 2009.
 Manuel de guérilla à l'usage des femmes, Grasset, 2009 (Essai en partie autobiographique)
 Géographie amoureuse du monde, Lattès, 2011.
 Géographie amoureuse du maïs, Lattès, 2012.
 L'Afrique est-elle si bien partie ?, Sciences Humaines, 2014.  Obtention du grand prix du festival géopolitique de Grenoble en 2015
 Croquer la pomme, l'histoire du fruit qui a perdu le monde et qui le sauvera, Lattès, 2016.
 Plaidoyer pour nos agriculteurs. Il faudra demain nourrir le monde, Buchet/Chastel, 2017 .
 .
 Pourquoi les paysans vont sauver le monde, Buchet-Chastel, 2020, rééd. poche Harper Collins, 2021.
 Manuel de guérison à l'usage des femmes, Albin Michel, 2021.

Novels 
 Cavalcades et Dérobades (roman), éditions Jean-Claude Lattès, 2008.
 prix Pégase de l’École nationale d'équitation 2009.
 Le Voyage à Timimoun, Lattès, 2010.
 Un escalier vers le paradis, Lattès, 2014.
 Crin Blanc ou l'invention de la Camargue (avec Florian Colomb de Daunant), Actes Sud, 2016.
 Le Bonheur à cheval (avec Alain Bellanger), Belin, 2017.
 Camargue, Crin-Blanc et ses légendes, Nevicata, coll. L'âme des peuples, 2019.

References 

1960 births
Living people
French economists
French geographers